Papua New Guinea competed at the 1984 Summer Paralympics in Stoke Mandeville and New York City. It was the country's first participation in the Paralympic Games. Papua New Guinea was represented by four athletes, all competing in track and field. None won any medals.

See also
1984 Summer Paralympics
Papua New Guinea at the Paralympics
Papua New Guinea at the 1984 Summer Olympics

External links
International Paralympic Committee

References

Nations at the 1984 Summer Paralympics
1984
Paralympics